Fritz Breithaupt (born 1967) is a scholar and critic in the fields of German literature, intellectual history, and cognitive science. Currently, he is chair of the Department of Germanic Studies at Indiana University Bloomington.

Career 

Fritz Breithaupt graduated from the Universität Hamburg in 1991, and received both an MA (1993) and PhD (1997) in Germanic Studies from Johns Hopkins University. He has been teaching at Indiana University, Bloomington since 1996, since 2010 as a full professor of Germanic Studies, an adjunct professor of Comparative Literature, and an affiliate professor of Cognitive Science. He co-founded the European Union Center at Indiana University in 2005 and served as its co-director until 2007.  In Germany, he is most well known outside of academic circles as a columnist for ZEIT Campus magazine and the author of the recurring feature "Frag den Prof" ("Ask the professor").
His academic research focuses on German literary history from the eighteenth to the twentieth centuries, with particular emphasis on such authors as Goethe, Lessing, Kleist, Benjamin, Nietzsche, Derrida, and Celan. In particular, his work on Goethe's novel Elective Affinities has been compared to Walter Benjamin's. In 2009-10, he was the distinguished Remak Scholar of Indiana University. He has twice (in 2003 and 2009) won the grant of the Alexander von Humboldt foundation, which is "granted in recognition of a researcher's entire achievements to date to academics whose fundamental discoveries, new theories, or insights have had a significant impact on their own discipline and who are expected to continue producing cutting-edge achievements in the future." His 2017 book on the dark sides of empathy offers an analysis of Donald Trump's technique to draw empathy to himself. The book appeared on the German bestseller list in February 2017(Spiegel-Bestseller Liste).

Selected publications

Books 

Jenseits der Bilder: Goethes Politik der Wahrnehmung, 2000

Der Ich-Effekt des Geldes: Zur Geschichte einer Legitimationsfigur, 2008

Kulturen der Empathie, 2009

Culturas de la Empatía, 2011

Kultur der Ausrede, 2012

Die dunklen Seiten der Empathie, 2017

Edited Volumes 

Empathie und Erzählung (with Claudia Breger), 2010

Narrative Empathy (with Claudia Breger): special issue of Deutsche Vierteljahrschrift, September 2008

Goethe and the Ego, special section of Goethe Yearbook XI, 2002

Goethe and Wittgenstein: Seeing the Worlds Unity in its Variety (with 
Richard Raatzsch and Bettina Kremberg), Wittgenstein Studies 5, 2002

Articles and Essays 

"A Three-Person Model of Empathy” in: Emotion Review 4, 2012

“Von Gott gerufen werden: Narration und Ausrede,” in Stefan Börnchen, Georg Mein, Martin Roussel, Eds., Namen, Ding, Referenzen, 2012

“The Birth of Narrative from the Spirit of the Excuse. A Speculation,” in: Poetics Today 32, 2011

“How is Empathy Possible? Four Models,” forthcoming in: Paula Leverage, Howard Mancing, Richard Schweickert, Jennifer Marston William, Eds., Theory of Mind and Literature

“How I feel your Pain: Lessing’s Mitleid, Goethe’s Anagnorisis, Fontane’s Quiet Perversion,” in: Deutsche Vierteljahrschrift, 2008

“The Invention of Trauma in German Romanticism,” in: Critical Inquiry, 2005

“The Culture of Images: Goethe’s Elective Affinities,” in: Monatshefte 92.3, 2000

References

External links 
 Faculty Webpage at Indiana University 
Breithaupt named Interim Dean of IU Hutton Honors College
Review of Der Ich-Effekt des Geldes in The Goethe Yearbook (German)
Review of Kulturen der Empathie in Frankfurter Allgemeine Zeitung (German)
ZEIT Campus columns (German)

1967 births
Living people
German critics
German emigrants to the United States
German scholars
Indiana University Bloomington faculty
Indiana University Bloomington Department of German faculty
Johns Hopkins University alumni
University of Hamburg alumni
Professors of German in the United States

de:Fritz Breithaupt